These were the destinations served by Sabena, the national airline of Belgium, at the moment of bankruptcy in 2001. Some flights were operated by Delta Air Transport, Schreiner Airways and Sobelair:

Destinations

Africa
 
 Luanda - Quatro de Fevereiro Airport
 
 Cotonou - Cadjehoun Airport
 
 Ouagadougou - Ouagadougou Airport
 
 Douala - Douala International Airport
 Yaoundé - Yaoundé Nsimalen International Airport
 
 Kinshasa - N'djili Airport
 
 Banjul - Banjul International Airport
 
 Conakry - Conakry International Airport
 
 Abidjan - Port Bouet Airport
 
 Nairobi - Jomo Kenyatta International Airport
 
 Monrovia - Roberts International Airport
 
 Bamako - Bamako–Sénou International Airport
 
 Casablanca - Mohammed V International Airport
 
 Lagos - Murtala Muhammed International Airport
 
 Kigali - Kigali International Airport
 
 Lomé - Lomé–Tokoin International Airport
 
 Entebbe - Entebbe International Airport

America

North America
 
 Nassau - Lynden Pindling International Airport
 
 Montreal - Montréal–Pierre Elliott Trudeau International Airport
 
 Atlanta - Hartsfield–Jackson Atlanta International Airport
 Boston - Logan International Airport
 Chicago - O'Hare International Airport
 Cincinnati - Cincinnati/Northern Kentucky International Airport
 Dallas - Dallas/Fort Worth International Airport
 New York City - John F. Kennedy International Airport
 Newark - Newark Liberty International Airport

Asia
 
 Chennai - Chennai International Airport
 
 Tokyo - Narita International Airport

Middle East
 
 Tel Aviv - Ben Gurion Airport
 
 Beirut - Beirut–Rafic Hariri International Airport

Europe

Central Europe
 
 Vienna - Vienna International Airport
 
 Geneva - Geneva Airport

Eastern Europe
 
 Sofia - Sofia Airport
 
 Prague - Prague Ruzyně Airport
 
 Budapest - Budapest Ferihegy International Airport
 
 Warsaw - Warsaw Chopin Airport
 
 Bucharest - Henri Coandă International Airport
 
 Moscow - Vnukovo International Airport

Northern Europe
 
 Copenhagen - Copenhagen Airport
 
 Helsinki - Helsinki Airport
 
 Oslo - Oslo Gardermoen Airport
 
 Gothenburg - Göteborg Landvetter Airport
 Stockholm - Stockholm Arlanda Airport

Southern Europe
 
 Athens - Ellinikon International Airport
 
 Bologna - Bologna Guglielmo Marconi Airport
 Catania - Catania–Fontanarossa Airport
 Florence - Florence Airport
 Milan
 Linate Airport
 Milan Malpensa Airport
 Naples - Naples International Airport
 Rome -  Leonardo da Vinci–Fiumicino Airport
 Turin - Turin Airport
 Venice - Venice Marco Polo Airport
 Verona - Verona Villafranca Airport
 
 Faro - Faro Airport
 Lisbon - Lisbon Airport
 Porto - Porto Airport
 
 Alicante - Alicante–Elche Airport
 Barcelona - Josep Tarradellas Barcelona–El Prat Airport
 Bilbao - Bilbao Airport
 Madrid - Adolfo Suárez Madrid–Barajas Airport
 Málaga - Málaga Airport
 Seville - Seville Airport
 Valencia - Valencia Airport
 
 Istanbul - Istanbul Atatürk Airport

Western Europe
 
 Bordeaux - Bordeaux–Mérignac Airport
 Lyon - Lyon–Saint-Exupéry Airport
 Marseille - Marseille Provence Airport
 Nantes - Nantes Atlantique Airport
 Nice - Nice Côte d'Azur Airport
 Paris - Charles de Gaulle Airport
 Strasbourg - Strasbourg Airport
 Toulouse - Toulouse–Blagnac Airport
 
 Berlin - Berlin Tempelhof Airport
 Düsseldorf - Düsseldorf Airport
 Frankfurt - Frankfurt Airport
 Hamburg - Hamburg Airport
 Hanover - Hannover Airport
 Munich - Munich Airport
 Nuremberg - Nuremberg Airport
 Stuttgart - Stuttgart Airport
 
 Dublin - Dublin Airport
 
 Luxembourg City - Luxembourg Airport
 
 Amsterdam - Amsterdam Airport Schiphol
 
 Belfast - Belfast International Airport
 Bristol - Bristol Airport
 Edinburgh - Edinburgh Airport
 Glasgow - Glasgow Airport
 Leeds - Leeds Bradford Airport
 London
 London City Airport
 London Heathrow Airport
 Manchester - Manchester Airport
 Newcastle - Newcastle Airport

Historical destinations

Africa

Central Africa
 
 Bujumbura - Bujumbura International Airport
 
 Brazzaville - Brazzaville Airport
 
 Entire domestic network in Congo before 1960

Northern Africa
 
 Algiers - Houari Boumediene Airport
 
 Cairo - Cairo International Airport
 
 Tripoli - Tripoli International Airport
 
 Tunis - Tunis–Carthage International Airport

Southern Africa
 
 Johannesburg - Johannesburg International Airport
 
 Dar es Salaam -  Julius Nyerere International Airport
 Kilimanjaro - Kilimanjaro International Airport
 
 Lusaka - Kenneth Kaunda International Airport

Western Africa
 
 Sal - Amílcar Cabral International Airport
 
 Libreville - Libreville International Airport
 
 Nouakchott - Nouakchott International Airport
 
 Niamey - Diori Hamani International Airport
 
 Kano - Mallam Aminu Kano International Airport
 
 Freetown - Lungi International Airport

America

North America
 
 Nassau - Lynden Pindling International Airport
 
 Montreal - Montréal–Mirabel International Airport
 Toronto - Toronto Pearson International Airport
 
 Anchorage - Ted Stevens Anchorage International Airport
 Atlanta - Hartsfield–Jackson Atlanta International Airport
 Detroit - Detroit Metropolitan Airport
 Newark - Newark Liberty International Airport 
 
 Mexico City - Mexico City International Airport

Central America
 
 Guatemala City - La Aurora International Airport

South America
 
 Buenos Aires - Ministro Pistarini International Airport
 
 São Paulo - São Paulo/Guarulhos International Airport
 
 Santiago - Arturo Merino Benítez International Airport
 
 Montevideo - Carrasco International Airport

Asia

South Asia
 
 Mumbai - Chhatrapati Shivaji International Airport

Southeast Asia
 
 Jakarta - Halim Perdanakusuma International Airport
 
 Tehran - Tehran Mehrabad International Airport
 
 Kuala Lumpur - Kuala Lumpur International Airport
 
 Manila - Ninoy Aquino International Airport Terminal 1
 
 Singapore Changi Airport
 
 Bangkok - Don Mueang International Airport at the time still BKK

Southwest Asia
 
 Jeddah - King Abdulaziz International Airport

Europe

Central Europe
 
 Basel - EuroAirport Basel Mulhouse Freiburg
 Zürich - Zürich Airport

Eastern Europe
 
 Saint Petersburg - Pulkovo Airport

Southern Europe
 
 Rome - Leonardo da Vinci–Fiumicino Airport
 
 Ljubljana - Ljubljana Jože Pučnik Airport
 
 Barcelona - Barcelona–El Prat Airport
 Palma de Mallorca - Palma de Mallorca Airport

Western Europe
 
 Ajaccio -Ajaccio Napoleon Bonaparte Airport
 Paris - Orly Airport
 
 Bremen - Bremen Airport
 
 London - London Gatwick International Airport
 London - London Heathrow International Airport
 Sheffield - Robin Hood Airport Doncaster Sheffield

References

Lists of airline destinations
Sabena